Frederick Spencer, 4th Earl Spencer, KG, CB, PC (14 April 1798 – 27 December 1857), styled The Honourable Frederick Spencer until 1845, was a British naval commander, courtier, and Whig politician. He initially served in the Royal Navy and fought in the Napoleonic Wars and the Greek War of Independence, eventually rising to the rank of Vice-Admiral. He succeeded his elder brother as Earl Spencer in 1845 and held political office as Lord Chamberlain of the Household between 1846 and 1848 and as Lord Steward of the Household between 1854 and 1857. In 1849 he was made a Knight of the Garter.

Early life
Spencer was born on 14 April 1798 at the Admiralty Building, London, and was baptised in St Martin-in-the-Fields. He was the fifth child born to George Spencer, 2nd Earl Spencer, and Lady Lavinia Bingham. Among his siblings was older brothers John Spencer, 3rd Earl Spencer (whose wife died in childbirth) and Sir Robert Cavendish Spencer, who died unmarried at sea. His older sister Lady Sarah Spencer was the wife of William Lyttelton, 3rd Baron Lyttelton.

His paternal grandparents were Home Secretary John Spencer, 1st Earl Spencer, and his wife Margaret Georgiana Poyntz, daughter of the diplomat and courtier Stephen Poyntz. His maternal grandparents were Irish peer Charles Bingham, 1st Earl of Lucan, and his wife, the portrait miniature painter Margaret Smyth.

Spencer was educated at Eton from 1808 to 1811.

Career

Spencer then joined the Royal Navy as a midshipman on 18 September 1811, and fought in the Napoleonic Wars in the Mediterranean between 1811 and 1815. He served for a time under his brother, Captain the Hon. Robert Cavendish Spencer as a lieutenant aboard his ship , before receiving his own command, that of the brig  on the South America Station. He was promoted to the rank of post-captain on 26 August 1822.

During the Greek War of Independence he commanded  at the Battle of Navarino on 20 October 1827 and was appointed a Companion of the Order of the Bath in November of that year. The following year he fought with the Naval Brigade in the Morea expedition. For his actions he was made a Knight of the Order of St Louis of France and awarded the Order of St Anne of Russia and the Order of the Redeemer of Greece.

Political career
Spencer then retired from naval life and was elected Whig Member of Parliament for Worcestershire in 1831. He held this seat until 1832 and then represented Midhurst between 1832 and 1834 and again between 1837 and 1841. He was later an equerry in the household of the Duchess of Kent (Queen Victoria's mother) from 1840 to 1845. The latter year he succeeded his elder brother in the earldom and took his seat in the House of Lords.

When the Whigs came to power under Lord John Russell in 1846, Lord Spencer was appointed Lord Chamberlain of the Household. He was sworn of the Privy Council the same year. He resigned as Lord Chamberlain in 1848 but returned to the government as Lord Steward of the Household in early 1854 under Lord Aberdeen, a post he held until shortly before his death in 1857, the last two years under the premiership of Lord Palmerston. He was made a Knight of the Garter in 1849.

He was also promoted to Rear-Admiral in 1852. and to Vice-Admiral (on the reserve list) in 1857.

Personal life

Lord Spencer was twice married. He married firstly his second cousin, Georgiana Poyntz (1799–1851), daughter of William Stephen Poyntz on 23 February 1830. They had three children:

Lady Georgiana Frances Spencer (1832–1852), who died unmarried.
John Poyntz Spencer, 5th Earl Spencer (1835–1910), who married Charlotte Seymour, a granddaughter of Vice-Admiral Lord Hugh Seymour and a first cousin of his stepmother Adelaide Seymour.
Lady Sarah Isabella Spencer (1838–1919), who died unmarried.

After Georgiana's death in 1851 he married, secondly, Adelaide Horatia Seymour (1825–1877), daughter of Sir Horace Seymour and a great-granddaughter of Francis Seymour-Conway, 1st Marquess of Hertford, on 9 August 1854. They had two children:

Lady Victoria Alexandrina Spencer (1855–1906), who married William Mansfield, 1st Viscount Sandhurst, and had issue.
Charles Robert Spencer, 6th Earl Spencer (1857–1922), who married the Hon. Margaret Baring, daughter of Edward Baring, 1st Baron Revelstoke.

Lord Spencer died at the family seat at Althorp, Brington, Northamptonshire, in December 1857, aged 59, and was succeeded in the earldom by his only son from his first marriage, John, who became a Liberal politician. Spencer's son from his second marriage, Charles, who succeeded in the earldom in 1910, was also a Liberal politician. The Countess Spencer died at Guilsborough, Northamptonshire, in October 1877, aged 52.

Coat of arms

Ancestry

See also

References

External links

1798 births
1857 deaths
People educated at Eton College
04
Knights of the Garter
Members of the Parliament of the United Kingdom for Worcestershire
Members of the Privy Council of the United Kingdom
Companions of the Order of the Bath
UK MPs 1831–1832
UK MPs 1832–1835
UK MPs 1837–1841
Spencer, E4
Royal Navy admirals
Whig (British political party) politicians
British military personnel of the Greek War of Independence
Royal Navy personnel of the Napoleonic Wars